Pseudomicrocentria is a genus of sheet weavers that was first described by F. Miller in 1970.

Species
 it contains two species:
Pseudomicrocentria minutissima Miller, 1970 (type) – West, Central, South Africa
Pseudomicrocentria simplex Locket, 1982 – Malaysia
Pseudomicrocentria uncata Tanasevitch, 2020 – Malaysia (Borneo)

See also
 List of Linyphiidae species (I–P)

References

Araneomorphae genera
Linyphiidae
Spiders of Africa
Spiders of Asia